His Majesty's Prison Edinburgh is located in the west of Edinburgh on the main A71, in an area now known as Stenhouse, and, although never named as such, has commonly been known as Saughton Prison from the old name for the general area. The prison is situated on the edge of a predominantly residential area and has good transport and road links to the city centre, which provides good access both for local courts and prison visitors. The building of the prison began on 31 July 1914 with the first prisoner being received in 1919. The prison consists of four halls: Glenesk, Hermiston, Ingliston and Ratho.

The prison receives inmates from the courts in Edinburgh, the Lothians and the Borders. The prison manages adult male and female individuals including those on remand, short term sentences (serving less than 4 years), long term sentences (serving 4 years or more), life sentence prisoners and extended sentence prisoners (Order of Life Long Restrictions).

Healthcare

As of 1 November 2011, healthcare is provided by the NHS. Prior to this it was provided through prison service employed nursing staff, with a GP and on call service provided by the healthcare staff provider (Medacs). Lloyds Pharmacy currently supplies medication through daily deliveries (Monday to Saturday).

Library

The prison library was the winner of the 2010 UK Libraries Change Lives Award for its work in promoting literacy among its incarcerated population, who typically have much lower literacy rates than the general population. Kate King, the librarian, was also named UK public library staff of the year in 2014.

Notable inmates
Isla Bryson, believed to be the first transgender woman to be convicted of rape for offences she committed while a male 
 James Forbes – Son of notorious Leith double murderer Donald Forbes was imprisoned here after being found guilty of assault and torture of a man in Largs
 Stephen Gough – A naked rambler repeatedly imprisoned for public nudity
 Eduardo Paolozzi – Scottish sculptor and artist was held here for three months during World War II because of his Italian heritage
 Kenny Richey – Served 21 years on death row in Ohio, and spent 6 months at HMP Edinburgh before being found not guilty of Serious Assault to permanent disfigurement and was released on 8 March 2009
 Nicholas Rossi – American sex offender fugitive, who claims mistaken identity. 
 Vincent Reynouard - French holocaust denier and Nazi sympathiser. 
 Peter Tobin – Sentenced to life imprisonment with a whole life order for the murders of Angelika Kluk, Vicky Hamilton and Dinah McNicol.  Tobin died in October 2022.

References

1919 establishments in Scotland
Buildings and structures in Edinburgh
Edinburgh
Government buildings in Edinburgh
Government agencies established in 1919
Edinburgh